

John Herman Recknagel, also known as John H. Recknagel the Younger (12 October 1870, Brooklyn1940, Fouesnant) was an American painter, residing in France, who worked mostly in Brittany.

Biography 
His father was a wheat and spice merchant from Denmark, and his mother was German. He attended the National Academy of Design then, in 1891, went to France where he studied with Jean-Paul Laurens at the Académie Julian. His first exhibit at the Salon came in 1897. 

In 1899 he and his wife, Sybil Withon, of Boston, moved to Concarneau, where he became a friend of his fellow expatriate artist, . Beginning in 1906, he and his family lived near Fouesnant in a house they built on the outskirts of town. After World War I, he made occasional visits back to the United States. He is interred at the community cemetery in Fouesnant.

Specializing in landscapes and portraits, he focused on Brittany and his native New York, but also painted scenes from the places he visited; such as Dresden and venice. He never exhibited widely or made any significant effort to sell his works; being able to depend on an inheritance. 

The Musée des Beaux-Arts de Pont-Aven presented a major retrospective of his works in 1998.

References

Further reading 
 David Sellin and Catherine Puget : Peintres américains en Bretagne - 1864 - 1914, Pont-Aven, 1995 
 Catherine Puget and Gaëlle Lennon : John Recknagel 1871-1940, exhibition catalog, 1998, Musée de Pont-Aven

External links

20th-century American painters
American portrait painters
Académie Julian
Artists from Brooklyn
American emigrants to France
1870 births
1940 deaths
19th-century American painters